The 2006 Valencia Superbike World Championship round was the third round of the 2006 Superbike World Championship. It took place on the weekend of April 21–23, 2006 at the Circuit Ricardo Tormo in Valencia, Spain.

Results

Superbike race 1 classification

Superbike race 2 classification

Supersport race classification

References
 Superbike Race 1
 Superbike Race 2
 Supersport Race

Valencia Superbike World Championship round
Superbike World Championship round
Valencia